Mozambique has competed in nine Summer Olympic Games, starting at the 1980 Olympics in Moscow, Russia. They have never competed in the Winter Olympic Games.

Medal tables

Medals by Summer Games

Medals by sport

List of medalists

See also
 List of flag bearers for Mozambique at the Olympics

External links
 
 
 

 
Olympics